Wedding in White is a 1972 Canadian drama film written and directed by William Fruet, based on his earlier play. The film stars Carol Kane, Donald Pleasence, Doris Petrie, Doug McGrath, and Paul Bradley.

Synopsis 
Set during World War II, the film stars Carol Kane as Jeannie Dougall, a teenager who is raped by Billy (Doug McGrath), a friend of her brother Jimmie's (Paul Bradley), while the two men are home on furlough. She subsequently struggles against the harsh and cruel reaction of her parents Jim and Mary (Donald Pleasence and Doris Petrie) when she discovers that the incident has left her pregnant; Jim's proposed solution to the dilemma is to marry Jeannie off to Sandy (Leo Phillips), an old army friend of his who is in his 60s.

The play and film were inspired by a real woman Fruet met in his youth, who had been forced to marry an older man by her parents in the same circumstances.

Awards 
Wedding in White and Réjeanne Padovani were the only two Canadian films screened at the 1973 Cannes Film Festival.

The film won the Canadian Film Award for Best Feature Film in 1972.

It was later screened at the 1984 Festival of Festivals as part of Front & Centre, a special retrospective program of artistically and culturally significant films from throughout the history of Canadian cinema.

References

External links 
 

1972 films
1972 drama films
Canadian drama films
English-language Canadian films
Films based on Canadian plays
Films directed by William Fruet
Films set in Ontario
Films set in the 1940s
Best Picture Genie and Canadian Screen Award winners
Films about rape
1970s English-language films
1972 directorial debut films
1970s Canadian films